This is a list of people associated with Roosevelt University.

Presidents

Current president 
 Ali Malekzadeh

Past presidents 

 Ted Gross
 Charles "Chuck" R. Middleton: the last president
 Edward J. Sparling: the first president
 Rolf A. Weil

Advisory boards 
Members of early advisory boards included the following:

 Marian Anderson
 Pearl Buck
 Ralph Bunche
 Albert Einstein
 Marshall Field
 Thomas Mann
 Gunnar Myrdal
 Eleanor Roosevelt
 Albert Schweitzer

Notable alumni

Arts and entertainment 

Tony Alcantar: actor
Anthony Braxton: musician and composer
Merle Dandridge: Broadway actress and singer
Eddie Harris: jazz musician, saxophonist
Ramsey Lewis: jazz musician, host of Legends of Jazz and The Ramsey Lewis Morning Show, WNUA radio
Mary Ann Pollar: concert promoter, activist
Kate Quigley: comedian
Courtney Reed: Broadway actress and singer
Danitra Vance: comedian (The Second City, Saturday Night Live) and actress

Literature, news, and academia 

Ira Berkow: author and sportswriter, The New York Times
Susan Carlson: news anchor
Parvesh Cheena: actor
Eckhard Gerdes: novelist
Charles V. Hamilton: political science professor and co-author of Black Power
Howard Johnson: former chairman, Massachusetts Institute of Technology
Christopher Robert Reed: historian known for his expertise on the African American experience in 20th-century Chicago
Harold Horton Sheldon: professor and physicist
Martha M. Vertreace-Doody: poet, author, and teacher

Military 

 Stephen Iacovelli: U.S. Army Brigadier General
Jacques Paul Klein: USAF Major General

Politics 

 Melissa Bean (BA): U.S. Representative for Illinois's 8th congressional district, 2005–2011
 Leonard F. Becker: Illinois state senator
 Jesse Brown: United States Secretary of Veterans Affairs, 1993–97
 Carla Hayden: Librarian of Congress and former American Library Association president
Douglas Huff: Illinois politician
Ambassador Jacques Paul Klein ('63, '71, Hon. Dr. 2005): Senior Foreign Service Officer; Under-Secretary-General of the UN; special representative of the Secretary-General and Coordinator of United Nations Operations in Croatia (UNTAES); Bosnia and Herzegovina (UNMBIH); and Liberia (UNMIL)
Mort Kondracke: political commentator and journalist, author of Saving Milly: Love, Politics, and Parkinson's Disease
Ronnie Lewis, former mayor of Dolton, Illinois 
Blanche Manning: U.S. District Court Judge for the Northern District of Illinois
LeRoy Martin: Chief of Police for the State of Illinois, Central Management Services
Mel Reynolds: politician and Congressman, Illinois 2nd 1993–95
Fred Rice, Jr., Superintendent of the Chicago Police Department
Bobby Rush (BGS): politician and Congressman, Illinois 1st since 1993
Harold Washington (BA): lawyer, 51st Mayor of Chicago (first African American to hold the title), former state representative and state senator

Others 

 Dankmar Adler: architect of the auditorium building
 Sheldon Lavin (born 1932), billionaire owner, CEO and chairman of OSI Group
 Louis Sullivan: architect of the auditorium building
 Florenz Ziegfeld: founder of Chicago Musical College

Notable faculty:
Rose Hum Lee: first woman and the first Chinese American to head a US university sociology department, appointed 1956
Mojisola Adeyeye: Director General of NAFDAC, Nigeria; Founding Chair of Biopharmaceutical Sciences

References

List of Roosevelt University people
Roosevelt University people
Roosevelt